Satantango (tr. "Satan's Tango") is a 1985 novel by the Hungarian writer László Krasznahorkai. It is Krasznahorkai's debut novel. It was adapted into a widely acclaimed seven-hour film, Sátántangó (1994), directed by Béla Tarr. The English translation by George Szirtes won the Best Translated Book Award (2013).

Plot
The novel is a postmodernist piece, and while it has a plot, many details are not outlined and remain unclear. It consists of two parts, and each part consists of six sections; sections of the second part are numbered in reverse order. Every chapter is a long paragraph which does not contain line breaks. 

Most of the action occurs in a run-down Hungarian village ("estate") which is in a vicinity of an unnamed town but the inhabitants are almost isolated from the outside world. The main character, Irimiás, a con man posing as a savior, arrives at the estate, achieves an almost unlimited power over the inhabitants, gets them to give him all their hard-earned money, convinces them to move to another abandoned “estate” nearby, and then brings them to the town, where he disperses them around the country. The purpose of the whole exercise is to give Irimiás money and power.

Reception
Jacob Silverman of The New York Times reviewed the book in 2012, and wrote that it "shares many of [Krasznahorkai]'s later novels' thematic concerns — the abeyance of time, an apocalyptic sense of crisis and decay — but it's an altogether more digestible work. Its story skips around in perspective and temporality, but the narrative is rarely unclear. For a writer whose characters often exhibit a claustrophobic interiority, Krasznahorkai also shows himself to be unexpectedly expansive and funny here."

Theo Tait in The Guardian praised the novel and, in particular, said that it is "possessed of a distinctive, compelling vision". He noted that there is influence of Franz Kafka and Samuel Beckett visible in the novel.

External links
 Review from The Guardian
 Review from The New York Times
 Review from The LA Review of Books

See also
 1985 in literature
 Hungarian literature

References

1985 novels
Hungarian novels
Works by László Krasznahorkai
Postmodern novels
Magvető books